Camille Erlanger (25 May 186324 April 1919) was a French opera composer. He studied at the Paris Conservatory under Léo Delibes (composition), Georges Mathias (piano), as well as Émile Durand and Antoine Taubon (harmony). In 1888 he won the Prix de Rome for his cantata Velléda. His most famous opera, Le Juif polonais, was produced at the Opéra-Comique in 1900.

Erlanger died in Paris and was buried in the Père Lachaise Cemetery.

A street in Quebec City, Avenue Erlanger, is named after Erlanger.

Works

 Velléda, scène lyrique (1888), given at the Concerts Colonne in 1889
 La Légende de Saint-Julien l'Hospitalier, légende dramatique in three acts and seven tableaux, after the story by Gustave Flaubert, (1888)
 Kermaria, drame lyrique in three acts, libretto by Pierre-Barthélemy Gheusi, Opéra-Comique 8 February 1897
 Faublas, libretto by Pierre-Barthélemy Gheusi, 1897
 Le Juif polonais, after a novel by Erckmann-Chatrian, Opéra-Comique, 11 April 1900
 Le Fils de l'étoile, drame musical in five acts, libretto by Catulle Mendès, 20 April 1904, Palais Garnier
 La Glu, drame lyrique after the novel by Jean Richepin
 Aphrodite, drame musical in five acts and seven tableaux after the novel by Pierre Louÿs, adaptation by Louis de Gramont, 23 (or 27 ?) March 1906, Opéra-Comique
 Bacchus triomphant, 11 September 1909, Bordeaux
 L'Aube rouge, 29 December 1911, Rouen
 Hannele Mattern, rêve lyrique in five acts (1911), libretto by Jean Thorel and Louis-Ferdinand de Gramont (1854–1912) after the drama Hanneles Himmelfahrt by Gerhart Hauptmann, 28 January 1950, Strasbourg (Opéra du Rhin)
 La Sorcière, 18 December 1912, Paris
 Le Barbier de Deauville, 1917
 La Forfaiture,  1921, Paris

La Forfaiture, based on the 1915 film The Cheat, is the first opera to be based on a film scenario.

Notes

References
Forbes, Elizabeth (1992), 'Erlanger, Camille' in The New Grove Dictionary of Opera, ed. Stanley Sadie (London)

External links

 

French male classical composers
Jewish classical composers
French opera composers
Male opera composers
19th-century French Jews
1863 births
1919 deaths
Burials at Père Lachaise Cemetery
Conservatoire de Paris alumni
Pupils of Georges Mathias
Musicians from Paris
Prix de Rome for composition